San Patricio del Chañar is a town located in Añelo Department, in Neuquén Province, Argentina.

Economy 
In San Patricio del Chañar agriculture is one of the most important activities. The main crop is grapes, used for the production of wine, a new business for the area and the province.

Energy sources
The town is provided of electric energy by a small dam located in the area.

Culture
The word Chañar comes from the Quechuan language name for a kind of bush (chical in Spanish).

Populated places in Neuquén Province
Populated places established in 1973